The 2013–14 Alaska Aces season was the 28th season of the franchise in the Philippine Basketball Association (PBA).

Key dates

2013
November 3: The 2013 PBA Draft took place in Midtown Atrium, Robinson Place Manila.
Talk 'N Text Tropang Texters acquired the rights to Alaska’s 2013 second round draft pick (turned out to be John Paul Erram).
Alaska Aces acquired the rights to Talk ‘N Text’s 2015 second round draft pick.
November 27: PBA fined Alaska Aces players (₱ 1,000 each), Gabby Espinas and Calvin Abueva, for their respective technical fouls. (1st technical foul of both players in the 2013–14 PBA Philippine Cup)
December 12: PBA fined Alaska Aces head coach Luigi Trillo and Cyrus Baguio (₱ 1,000 each), for their respective technical fouls. (1st technical foul of the two in the 2013–14 PBA Philippine Cup)

2014
May 25: Luigi Trillo resigned as head coach due to family reasons and was replaced by Alex Compton.
June 4: Alaska Aces lost by 51 points (72–123) against Rain or Shine Elasto Painters. Making the game the fourth-most lopsided beating in PBA history, and the biggest margin of victory in 28 years, or since Shell annihilated Tanduay, 154-100, on November 16, 1986. Likewise, it’s the franchise’s biggest win, and the worst defeat for Alaska in their existence in the PBA.

Draft picks

Roster

 
 

  also serves as Alaska's board governor.

Philippine Cup

Eliminations

Standings

Game log

Playoffs

Bracket

Commissioner's Cup

Eliminations

Standings

Game log

Playoffs

Bracket

Governors' Cup

Eliminations

Standings

Bracket

Game log

Transactions

Recruited imports

References

Alaska Aces (PBA) seasons
Alaska